La Historia (The History) may refer to:

 La Historia (Caifanes album)
 La Historia (Intocable album)
 La Historia (Kumbia Kings album)
 La Historia (Kumbia Kings video album), a video by A.B. Quintanilla and Kumbia Kings
 La Historia (Ricky Martin album)
 La Historia Live, an album by Hector & Tito

See also